The 2018 Shanghai International Film Festival, held on June 17–24, 2018,  was the 21st such festival devoted to international cinema held in Shanghai, China.

International Jury 
The members of the jury for the Golden Goblet Award were:

 Ildikó Enyedi (Hungarian director and screenwriter)
 Semih Kaplanoğlu (Turkish filmmaker)
 Naomi Kawase (Japanese director)
 David Permut (US film producer)
 Qin Hailu (Chinese actress)
 Chang Chen (Chinese actor)

Official Selections

Winners

Golden Goblet Awards 

Best Feature Film: Out of Paradise by Batbayar Chogsom
Jury Grand Prix: Allagan
Best Director:  Rodrigo Barriuso & Sebastián Barriuso (Un Traductor)
Best Actor:  Tye Sheridan for Friday's Child
Best Actress: Isabelle Blais for Tadoussac
Best Screenplay: Tashidawa, Matsuga  for Allah Ginger
Best Cinematography: Jeffrey Bierman for Friday's Child
Artistic Contribution: Carnivore
Best Documentary: The Long Season
Best Animated Movie: The Oath of the Evening Flower-Bringing the Promised Flower to the Parting Dynasty
Best Animated Short: Tweet Tweet by Zhanna Bekmambetova
Best Live Action Short: White Sheep in the Car by Xu Min, Tan Diwen

Asian New Talent Awards 

 Best Film: The Road Not Taken
 Best Director: Yui Kiyohara for Our House in Shanghai
 Best Script Writer: Shireen Seno for Nervous Translation 
 Best Cinematographer: Ouyang Yongfeng for Blue Amber
 Best Actor:  Ding Xihe for Looking For Lucky
 Best Actress: Negar Moghaddam for Dressage in Shanghai

Jackie Chan Action Movie Awards 

 Best Action Movie: Operation Red Sea
 Best Action Movie Director: Wolf Warrior 2
 Best Action Choreographer: Wu Gang for Detective Chinatown 2
 Best Action Movie Actor: Wu Jing for Wolf Warrior 2
 Best Action Movie Actress: (tie) Fatima Sana Shaikh for Dangal  and Jiang Luxia for Operation Red Sea
 Best New Action Performer: Sanya Malhotra for  Dangal
 Best Special Effects: Operation Red Sea
 Best Fight: Chasing the Dragon
 Best Action Stuntman: Long Cuilong for Detective Chinatown 2
 Best Action Stuntwoman: Chen Jiaojiao for Brotherhood of Blades 2

Notable Attendees 
Notable attendees at the festival include Jesse Eisenberg, Smriti Kiran, Kirill Razlogov, Peng Yuyan, Xu Qing, Zhou Yun, Yang Zishan and Xu Zheng/

References

External links 

 Official Site

Shanghai International Film Festival
2018 film festivals
2018 festivals in Asia
21st century in Shanghai